is a Japanese 1996 mystery novel by Hiroshi Mori. It has been adapted into a manga, a visual novel, and a live action drama. An anime television series adaptation produced by A-1 Pictures premiered in Japan on October 8, 2015.

Plot
Sōhei Saikawa, an associate professor of architectural engineering, and Moe Nishinosono, the daughter of his mentor, travel to a remote island. While there, the two work together to solve the murders of a prominent artificial intelligence researcher and the director of the lab located on the island.

Characters

, Actor portrayal: Gō Ayano
 An associate professor of architecture at National N University. He has gained the admiration of Moe, but doesn't seem to reciprocate her feelings. He is extremely intelligent, he has detached himself from the world, and has no interest in fashion. When something intrigues him, he will spend a lot of time thinking about it and attempt to find out the objective truth. He loves coffee and cigarettes, and hates watermelon, red beans, and soybean flour. 

, Actor portrayal: Emi Takei, Ai Uchida (young)
 The daughter of Sōhei's mentor, and a first year student in the architecture department of N University. She is a beautiful young woman from a high-class family. She has excellent insight, powers of observation, and calculation skills, but sometimes her thoughts jump to extreme conclusions. She loves mystery novels and the sound of car engines. She hates dried shiitake mushrooms, but because she believes they are good for anemia, she enduringly eats them every day.

, Actor portrayal: Akari Hayami
 A genius programmer who was accused of killing her parents when she was 14, but she was found innocent due to her psychological condition. She lived in isolation at a private research lab on a remote island. Its eventually revealed that she had gotten pregnant by her uncle, giving birth to Miki and had planned to kill herself and Shindō. She intended to force Miki to take her identity but the plan had a toll on Miki; whom eventually killed herself. Shiki assumed her identity and eventually killed Shindō herself. Its never explained if its due to her "multiple" personalities or lack of empathy, but Shiki shows no qualms with killing and has little grievances. Though her new personalities might be her own way of showing the effects of her actions.

, Actor portrayal: Norimasa Fuke
 The head of the Magata Research Institute. He is Shiki's uncle. His hobby is to fly helicopters. Its later revealed he had an affair with his underage niece and its most likely fueled her to murder her parents.

, Actor portrayal: Kumiko Fujiyoshi
 Seiji's wife. She knew Shiki in her early childhood. Her speciality is making sweets.

, Actor portrayal: Go Riju
 The assistant head of the Magata Research Institute.

, Actor portrayal: Yasuto Kosuda
 The resident doctor at the Magata Research Institute.

 An employee at the Magata Research Institute who is one of the few who has been at the institute since its establishment.

 An employee at the Magata Research Institute. She is a programmer.

 A security guard at the Magata Research Institute.

 A security guard at the Magata Research Institute. His hobby is playing the marimba.

 Shiki's younger sister. She lives with a relative in America. Near the end its revealed that Miki killed herself due to her "sister"'s plans taking a toll. Furthermore she's revealed to be her daughter as a product of the affair with her uncle Shindō. After her death, Shiki assumed her identity.

,  Actor portrayal: Erena Mizusawa
 An architecture student at N University. She assists Sōhei Saikawa with his accounts. Since she has an androgynous look and also has a very straightforward way of speaking, the other students are afraid of her.

 A student at N University who works in Sōhei's lab. He is in charge of planning the seminar trip, and finds himself camping on Himaka island, where the Magata Research Institute is located.

 A beautiful fair-skinned woman who is a magazine reporter. She has a close relationship with Sōhei, so she knows about his dislike of red beans and calls him "Sōhei-kun."

 A butler who has served the Nishinosono family for many years. He looks after Moe's everyday needs.

Media

Novel
It won the Mephisto Prize for unpublished genre fiction novels and was published by Kodansha. It is the first volume of the S&M (Professor Saikawa and his student Moe) series. Nine additional volumes were published between 1996 and 1998. There are some short stories belonging to the S&M series. Two of those, "The Rooftop Ornaments of Stone Ratha" and "Which Is the Witch?", were translated into English and published by the BBB.

Manga
A manga adaptation drawn by Torao Asada was serialized in Gentosha's Comic Birz magazine in 2001.

Video game
A PlayStation visual novel adaptation was developed by KID and released in March 2002.

Live action
A 10-episode drama television series adaptation aired between October and December 2014. The drama series stars Gou Ayano as Sohei Saikawa and Emi Takei as Moe Nishinosono. Although the series is titled The Perfect Insider, it is a collection of Saikawa and Moe stories.

Anime
An anime television series adaptation, directed by Mamoru Kanbe, written by Toshiya Ono, and produced by A-1 Pictures, premiered on Fuji TV's Noitamina programming block on October 9, 2015.

See also
Tozai Mystery Best 100
Locked-room mystery

References

External links
Official anime website 
Drama series official website 

1996 Japanese novels
1996 video games
2015 anime television series debuts
2001 manga
A-1 Pictures
Anime and manga based on novels
Aniplex
Dissociative identity disorder in popular culture
Dissociative identity disorder in television
Gentosha manga
Japan-exclusive video games
Mystery anime and manga
Noitamina
PlayStation (console) games
PlayStation (console)-only games
Psychological anime and manga
Psychological novels
Sentai Filmworks
Seinen manga
Video games based on novels
Video games developed in Japan
Visual novels